Socialistisk Ungdomsforbund (Socialist Youth League), a leftist youth movement in Denmark 1935-1936. SUF was formed as a split from Danmarks Socialdemokratiske Ungdom. SUF published Revolte.

References

Politics of Denmark
Socialism in Denmark